The Twin Rivers Corrections Center opened in 1984 and is part of the Monroe Correctional Complex facility in Monroe, Washington. Currently, it is the largest prison in all of Washington State. It is now referred to as Twin Rivers Unit (TRU). It currently employs 1200 people. Monroe Correctional Complex is a Close, Medium, and Minimum security facility, which houses approximately 2800 inmates in five wings, typically two to a cell. Some inmates with special needs are housed in individual cells. Inmates are generally required to participate in some kind of program, whether it is educational, treatment, or Class III industries. Such programs may include earning a General Educational Development (GED) certificate, or sexual offender or chemical dependency treatment. Class III industries include janitorial, clerical or kitchen work, for example.

Prisons in Washington (state)
Buildings and structures in Snohomish County, Washington
1984 establishments in Washington (state)